Apostolepis breviceps, the Chacoan blackhead, is a species of snake in the family Colubridae. It is endemic to Bolivia.

References 

breviceps
Reptiles described in 2001
Reptiles of Bolivia
Taxa named by Miguel Trefaut Rodrigues